Tetrahydrocannabivarin (THCV, THV, O-4394, GWP42004) is a homologue of tetrahydrocannabinol (THC) having a propyl (3-carbon) side chain instead of a pentyl (5-carbon) group on the molecule, which makes it produce very different effects from THC.

Natural occurrence
THCV is prevalent in certain central Asian and southern African strains of Cannabis.

Chemistry 

Similar to THC, THCV has 7 possible double bond isomers and 30 stereoisomers (see: Tetrahydrocannabinol#Isomerism). The alternative isomer Δ8-THCV is known as a synthetic compound with a code number of O-4395, but it is not known to have been isolated from Cannabis plant material.

Description 
Plants with elevated levels of propyl cannabinoids (including THCV) have been found in populations of Cannabis sativa L. ssp. indica  (= Cannabis indica Lam.) from China, India, Nepal, Thailand, Afghanistan, and Pakistan, as well as southern and western Africa.  THCV levels up to 53.7% of total cannabinoids have been reported.

THCV is a cannabinoid receptor type 1 antagonist or, at higher doses, a CB1 receptor agonist and cannabinoid receptor type 2 partial agonist. Δ8-THCV has also been shown to be a CB1 antagonist. Both papers describing the antagonistic properties of THCV were demonstrated in murine models. THCV is an antagonist of THC at CB1 receptors and lessens the psychoactive effects of THC.

Biosynthesis 
Unlike THC, cannabidiol (CBD), and cannabichromene (CBC), THCV doesn't begin as cannabigerolic acid (CBGA). Instead of combining with olivetolic acid to create CBGA, geranyl pyrophosphate joins with divarinolic acid, which has two fewer carbon atoms. The result is cannabigerovarin acid (CBGVA).  Once CBGVA is created, the process continues exactly the same as it would for THC. CBGVA is broken down to tetrahydrocannabivarin carboxylic acid (THCVA) by the enzyme THCV synthase. At that point, THCVA can be decarboxylated with heat or UV light to create THCV.

Research

Reducing blood sugar
THCV is a new potential treatment against obesity-associated glucose intolerance with pharmacology different from that of CB1 inverse agonists/antagonists. GW Pharmaceuticals is studying plant-derived tetrahydrocannabivarin (as GWP42004) for type 2 diabetes in addition to metformin.

Appetite control
THC increases appetite, which is sometimes referred to as "the munchies." THC acts as a CB1 agonist. As a CB1 antagonist,
THCV has been shown to reduce appetite in murine models.

Legal status
It is not scheduled by Convention on Psychotropic Substances.  In the United States, THCV is not specifically listed as a Schedule I drug, but "Marijuana Extract" is.  THCV could be considered an analog of THC, in which case, sales or possession intended for human consumption could be prosecuted under the Federal Analog Act.

United States
THCV is not scheduled at the federal level so long as it is not derived from cannabis varieties that produce more than .3% THC on a dry weight basis in the United States.

The 2018 United States farm bill legalized the production and sale of THCV if it is derived from hemp compliant with the farm bill.

See also 
 Cannabinoid
 Cannabis
 Cannabivarin (CBV)
 Cannabidivarin (CBDV)
 Federal Analogue Act
 Medical cannabis
 Parahexyl
 Rimonabant (synthetic CB1 antagonist)
 Tetrahydrocannabiorcol (Δ9-THCC, (C1)-Δ9-THC)
 Tetrahydrocannabutol (Δ9-THCB, (C4)-Δ9-THC)
 Tetrahydrocannabihexol (Δ9-THCH, (C6)-Δ9-THC)
 Tetrahydrocannabiphorol (Δ9-THCP, (C7)-Δ9-THC)

References

External links 
 Erowid Compounds found in Cannabis sativa

Phytocannabinoids
CB1 receptor antagonists
Terpeno-phenolic compounds
Benzochromenes